Home Is Where the Heart Is is the second album released on RCA Records by David Cassidy. It was released in 1976 and was produced by Cassidy and Bruce Johnston. Although critically well received, the album did not chart in any country. The album is noted in particular for Cassidy's recording of Paul McCartney's song "Tomorrow" which McCartney rated as taking the song to its ultimate potential.

The album includes a composing contribution from Gerry Beckley of the band America. Beckley also takes a few lines of lead vocals. Some tracks from this album are compiled in the 1996 collection, When I'm a Rock 'n' Roll Star.

Track listing
"On Fire" (David Cassidy, Bill House)
"Damned If This Ain't Love" (David Cassidy)
"January" (David Paton)
"A Fool in Love" (Bill House, David Cassidy)
"Tomorrow" (Paul McCartney, Linda McCartney)
"Breakin' Down Again" (David Cassidy, Bill House)
"Run and Hide" (Bill House, David Cassidy)
"Take This Heart" (David Cassidy, Gerry Beckley)
"Goodbye Blues" (Ronnie S. Wilkins)
"Half Past Your Bedtime" (David Cassidy, Gerry Beckley, Ricky Fataar)

Personnel
David Cassidy - guitar, percussion, keyboards, vocals
Jesse Ed Davis - guitar
Ned Doheny - guitar
Danny Kortchmar - guitar
Bill House - guitar, steel guitar, vocals
Bryan Garofalo - bass, guitar
Leland Sklar - bass
Willie Weeks - bass
Emory Gordy, Jr. - bass
Curtis Stone - bass
Harry Robinson - banjo
Stephen Ross - keyboards
Tom Hensley - keyboards
Bruce Johnston - keyboards, vocals
John Hobbs - keyboards, vocals
Jim Keltner - drums
Jim Gordon - drums
Gary Mallaber - drums
Ricky Fataar - drums
Stan House - drums
Ron Tutt - drums
King Errisson - Percussion
John Raines - percussion
Jim Seiter - percussion, vocals
Carl Wilson - vocals
Richie Furay - vocals
Cyrus Faryar - vocals
Philip Austin - vocals
Gerry Beckley - vocals
Dewey Bunnell - vocals
Gloria Grinel - vocals
Kenny Hinkle - vocals
Steve House - vocals
Bill Hudson - vocals
Brett Hudson - vocals
Mark Hudson - vocals
Jon Joyce - Vocals
Trish Turner - vocals
Howard Kaylan - vocals
Mark Volman - vocals
Henry Diltz - harmonica
Steve Douglas - saxophone
Quzaimi Nadzir - composer

References

David Cassidy albums
1976 albums
RCA Records albums